USRC Eagle was one of the first ten cutters operated by the United States' Revenue Cutter Service (later to become the US Coast Guard).

The Eagle has been often misidentified as the cutter Pickering, which was in fact not launched until 1798 (and so was not among the first ten cutters).  Eagle was built in Savannah, Georgia for service in that state's waters.  Savannah remained her homeport throughout her career as a revenue cutter.

Description
The only surviving documentation regarding the cutter Eagle construction, dimensions, or her rig is a description written when she was sold in 1799:

... that the said ship or vessel has one deck and two masts, and that her length is fifty five feet ten inches, her breadth seventeen feet six inches, her depth six feet eight inches and that she measures fifty five 66/95 tons; that she is square sterned long quarter has Quarter Deck Badges and no Galleries and an Eagle head.

Operational service

Some documentation does survive that provides a glimpse at her duties. Cutters typically were assigned to duty by the local collector of customs and as such they carried out a myriad of tasks and Eagle was no exception.  She was assigned to enforce the quarantine restrictions imposed during the outbreak of yellow fever in Philadelphia in 1793.  For that task she lay off Cockspur Island and prevented any vessel carrying infected persons from entering Savannah Harbor.

There are glimpses in the records of some of her adventures as a revenue cutter.  She had a small hand in the establishment of the United States Navy when, in 1794, Eagle delivered woodcutting supplies to contractors on St. Simons Island.  The contractors were to supply wood for the frigates recently authorized by the United States Congress, an authorization that marks the birth of the nation's second oldest sea-going service.

Lynx incident

In 1795, the cutter was on an "unofficial" mission; Senator Pierce Butler, from South Carolina, needed to transport a cargo of wool to his plantation on St. Simons Island and somehow convinced either Hendrick Fisher, the acting commanding officer of Eagle as Master John Howell was not available – or the local customs collector – that Eagle should carry out this task. (According to some documentation discovered by Florence Kern, Eagle commanding officer "did not feel obliged to be at the helm of Eagle at all times," and therefore left her in the care of her first mate, Hendrick Fisher, on many occasions.)

Trouble appeared off Jekyll Island, when the Royal Navy ship sloop , under the command of Captain John Poo Beresford, fired a shot across the cutter's bow.  Fisher attempted to heave-to, but the Senator ordered him to sail on.  Lynx then began to fire continuously as Eagle sailed towards the shoal waters on the north point of Jekyll Island.  As Lynx drew too much water to continue the chase, Beresford sent his pinnace and cutter, under Lieutenant Alex Skene, in pursuit.  They quickly overtook the schooner and came on board, demanding to know why Eagle had not come about when fired upon by a vessel of His Majesty's navy.  After learning the schooner was in fact a revenue vessel of the U.S. government, the Royal Navy lieutenant returned with his men to their boats and hence to their sloop.

In the ensuing international furor that this clash engendered, Beresford stated that Lynx was outside the 12 mile limit and noted that the schooner was not flying any flag.  The national ensign was in fact not displayed on board Eagle for unexplained reasons but was instead stored in the captain's cabin.  Eagle did apparently display some sort of small pennant, but it was not visible to Lynx.

Fate
She was sold on 14 September 1799 for $595

Crew

John Howell, Master; 1793–1799.

Hendrick Fisher, First Mate, 1793–1798 (?)
John Wood, Second Mate, 1793–1794.
James Christian, Second Mate, 1794–1795.
Benjamin Forsyth, Second Mate, 1795–1798; promoted to First Mate in 1798 (?)
William Duncan (died while a seaman on Eagle in 1797).

References
Eagle, 1793, US Coast Guard website.
Canney, Donald, 1995:  U.S. Coast Guard and Revenue Cutters, 1790–1935. Annapolis, MD: Naval Institute Press.
Stephen H. Evans, 1949: The United States Coast Guard, 1790–1915: A Definitive History (With a Postscript: 1915–1950).  Annapolis: The United States Naval Institute.
Kern, Florence, 1978: John Howell's U.S. Revenue Cutter Eagle, Georgia, 1793–1799, Washington, DC: Alised Enterprises.
U.S. Coast Guard, 1934: Record of Movements: Vessels of the United States Coast Guard: 1790 – December 31, 1933,  Washington, DC: U.S. Government Printing Office (reprinted 1989).

First ten Revenue Service cutters
1793 ships
United Kingdom–United States military relations
Political scandals in South Carolina
Maritime incidents in 1795